Digby Bell (born Digby Valentine Bell; November 8, 1849 – June 20, 1917) was a popular vaudeville entertainer and Broadway performer at the beginning of the 20th century.

Early life
Bell was born in Milwaukee, Wisconsin on November 8, 1849.

Performing career

Bell studied in Europe to become a concert singer, and became famous for his roles in comic musical productions, such as Gilbert and Sullivan comic operas and with the McCaull Comic Opera Company. His first starring role was in the musical Jupiter in 1892. He appeared many times with Lillian Russell in shows such as Princess Nicotine, The Queen of Brilliants and The Grand Duchess of Gerolstein. He introduced the song '"The Man Who Broke the Bank at Monte Carlo".

Bell gave a concert at Chickering Hall in New York City on April 26, 1878, that was favorably reviewed by the New York Times.

Much of Bell's later career was in nonmusical plays or vaudeville.

Notable stage appearances
Broadway appearances

 The Begum, Sep 21, 1887 - Dec 10, 1887, role - Myhnt-Jhuleep
 The Hoosier Doctor, Apr 18, 1898 - [unknown], role - Dr. Willow
 Mr. Pickwick, Jan 19, 1903 - May 1903, role - Sam Weller
 The Education of Mr. Pipp, Feb 20, 1905 - Apr 1905, role - J. Wesley Pipp
 An International Marriage, Jan 4, 1909 - Jan 1909
 The Debtors, Oct 12, 1909 - Oct 1909, role - William Dorritt
 The Yeomen of the Guard, Apr 19, 1915 - May 8, 1915, role - Chorus
 The Sorcerer, May 24, 1915 - Jun 5, 1915, role - Dr. Daly

Film appearances
 The Education of Mr. Pipp (1914)
 Father and the Boys (1915)

Partial discography

1909

 The Tough Boy on the Right Field Fence
 The Blind Boy in the Gallery
 The Man Who Fanned Casey  (A reply to 'Casey at the Bat'.)
 Experiences of a Commuter
 Day and Knight
 A Discontented Egg

Personal life

Bell was married at least twice. His first wife, Lillian Brooks, divorced him in March 1883. He married his second wife, Laura Joyce Bell (née Hannah Joyce Maskell), a day or so after his divorce from Brooks was finalized. Laura Joyce Bell died in New York in 1904.<ref>^ Digby V. Bell again Married. The New York Times,’’ March 19, 1883, p. 14</ref>

Bell was a fervent golfer and New York Giants baseball fan, as was his best friend and frequent co-star DeWolf Hopper.

Death
Bell died on June 20, 1917, in New York City. He is buried in Woodlawn Cemetery, Bronx, New York.

FilmographyThe Education of Mr. Pipp (1914)Father and the Boys'' (1915)

References

External links

Digby Bell in a recording of The Blind Boy in the gallery 1909
'The Bright Stars of Yesterday-Digby Bell'

1849 births
1917 deaths
19th-century American male singers
19th-century American singers
19th-century American male actors
American male stage actors
Male actors from Milwaukee
Vaudeville performers
20th-century American male actors
Burials at Woodlawn Cemetery (Bronx, New York)
20th-century American male singers
20th-century American singers